The coat of arms of the German state and city of Hamburg is a kind of national emblem. The coat of arms and the flags are regulated by the constitution of Hamburg and law. The colors of Hamburg are white and red. One of the oldest versions of the castle is found on a seal in 1241.

Description
All coat of arms show a castle with three towers. The middle tower shows a cross on top. It is believed that the so-called Marian stars on top of the two side-towers and the cross recalls the fact that Hamburg used to be an archbishopric. The towers and the walls with their pinnacles and the closed gate symbolized the determination of the town to defend itself.

Greater Coat of Arms
The Greater Coat of Arms shows the castle, the stars and the church in silver on red ground with two lions standing on a compartment. The top is like the middle coat of arms with a helmet with crest including three peacock feathers and six banners of the arms and a mantling. This coat of arms is protected and only allowed to be used by the Senat and the Diet of Hamburg.

Admiralty Coat of Arms of Hamburg
The Admiralty Coat of Arms of Hamburg is used for official ships of Hamburg.

History

The oldest coat of arms of Hamburg has been retained on city seals of the 12th and 13th centuries. During the centuries the towers, walls, pinnacles and symbols of the coat of arms of Hamburg changed several times, without changing in character. The central castle was shown with opened doors sometimes with closed doors and with a portcullis.

The third known seal is attached to a document dated 15 March 1264, in which the Council of Hamburg grants the merchants of Hanover free passage to and from Hanover for trading purposes. This restored seal is deposited in the Stadtarchiv Hannover.

The colors of version of the lesser arms of 2008 are declared by an act of law of the Senate of Hamburg on 14 May 1752. Before the tincture was a red castle on white ground. Since 1952, the coat of arms and the flags are regulated by the constitution of Hamburg. The colors of Hamburg are white and red. In general the use of city seals with the coat of arms was a privilege of the City Council. The city elders had to watch its maintenance. Even now the coat of arms is protected and can only be used under specific circumstances.

Greater Coat of Arms
The coat of arms has existed since the 16th century.

Admiralty Coat of Arms of Hamburg
In 1623, a Admiralitätskollegium (lit. admiralty council) was established to oversee the law of sea and the security of shipping, as a port authority. The coat of arms exists since 1642. In 1811, abandoned during the French occupation, the admiralty council was officially disestablished in 1814, and succeeded as a court instance by the Handelsgericht (trade court) and for administrative purposes by the port and shipping deputation (German title: Schifffahrts- und Hafendeputation).

See also

Armorial of Hamburg
Coat of arms of Prussia
Origin of the coats of arms of German federal states.

References

External links

Hamburg
Hamburg
German coats of arms
Coat Of Arms
Coat Of Arms
Hamburg
Hamburg
Hamburg
Hamburg
Hamburg